Webb is a rural unincorporated community in Webb County, Texas, United States, located 20 miles north of Laredo. According to the 1990 census it had a population of 40.

History

Webb, Texas was established as a railroad stop on the International-Great Northern Railroad in 1881. The town was named in honor of the county it was founded on. A Webb post office, established in 1909, was still in operation in 1980. According to a local count in 1914 Webb, Texas had a population of 100 but its population declined to 25 in 1936.

References

University of Texas Historical Files; Webb, Texas

Unincorporated communities in Webb County, Texas
Unincorporated communities in Texas